Plastic-coated paper is a coated or laminated composite material made of paper or paperboard with a plastic layer or treatment on a surface. This type of coated paper is most used in the food and drink packaging industry.

Function
The plastic is used to improve functions such as  water resistance, tear strength, abrasion resistance, ability to be heat sealed, etc.

Some papers are laminated by heat or adhesive to a plastic film to provide barrier properties in use.   Other papers are coated with a melted plastic layer:  curtain coating is one common method.

Printed papers commonly have a top coat of a protective polymer to seal the print, provide scuff resistance, and sometimes gloss.   Some coatings are processed by  UV curing for stability.

Components
Most plastic coatings in the packaging industry are polyethylene (LDPE) and to a much lesser degree PET.
Liquid packaging board cartons typically contain 74% paper, 22% plastic and 4% aluminum. Frozen food cartons are usually made up of an 80% paper and 20% plastic combination.

Applications
The most notable applications for plastic-coated paper are single use (disposable food packaging):
Liquid packaging board for milk and juice folding cartons
hot and cold paper drinking cups 
paper plates  
frozen food containers
plastic-lined paper bags
take-out containers
waterproof paper (also multi-use)
 heat sealable paper
 barrier packaging

End of life and environmental issues

Plastic coatings or layers usually make  paper recycling more difficult.  Some plastic laminations can be separated from the paper during the recycling process, allowing filtering out the film.  If the coated paper is shredded prior to recycling,  the degree of separation depends on the particular process.  Some plastic coatings are water dispersible to aid recycling and repulping.  Special recycling processes are available to help separate plastics.   Some plastic coated papers are incinerated for heat or landfilled rather than recycled.

Most plastic coated papers are not suited to composting. but do variously end up in compost bins, sometimes even legally so. In this case, the remains of the non-biodegradable plastics components form part of the global microplastics waste problem.

See also

Paper pallet
Folding boxboard
Food can
 Lamination paper
Plastic wrap
Plastic bottle
Disposable
Wood-plastic composite

References

External links

Composite materials
Packaging materials
Coated paper
Plastics and the environment
Environmental impact of products